The KwaZulu-Natal Division of the High Court of South Africa is a superior court of law with general jurisdiction over the KwaZulu-Natal province of South Africa. The main seat of the division is at Pietermaritzburg, while a subordinate local seat at Durban has concurrent jurisdiction over the coastal region of the province.  the Judge President of the division is Chiman Patel.

History
The Natalia Republic, established in 1839 by Voortrekkers, was annexed by Britain in 1843 and renamed Natal. In 1844 it was attached to the Cape Colony, and in 1846 a District Court for Natal was established with its seat in Pietermaritzburg. In 1856 Natal was detached from the Cape and became a separate colony, and in 1857 the District Court was replaced by a Supreme Court of Natal. When the Union of South Africa was formed in 1910, the Supreme Court of Natal became the Natal Provincial Division of the Supreme Court of South Africa; at the same time, the circuit court at Durban became the Durban & Coast Local Division. When the current Constitution of South Africa came into force in 1997, the courts became High Courts, and in 2009 they were renamed the KwaZulu-Natal High Courts. In 2013, in the restructuring brought about by the Superior Courts Act, the courts became two seats of a single KwaZulu-Natal Division of the High Court of South Africa.

After former South African President Jacob Zuma failed to appear in court on 4 February 2020, the KwaZulu-Natal Division of the High Court of South Africa issued an arrest warrant against Zuma.

Seats

References

External links 
 Decisions handed down up to 2009
 Decisions handed down at Pietermaritzburg since 2009
 Decisions handed down at Durban since 2009

High Court
High Court of South Africa
Durban
Pietermaritzburg
1848 establishments in South Africa
Courts and tribunals established in 1848